Aida Margarita Parada Rodriguez (born August 29, 1977) is an American comedian of Puerto Rican/Dominican descent who is best known for her appearance as a contestant on the eighth season of Last Comic Standing and as a commentator on The Young Turks. She is also an actress, producer, writer, and podcaster.

Early life
Rodriguez was born in Boston, Massachusetts and taken to the Dominican Republic shortly afterward. As a child, her mother kidnapped her from her father in the Dominican Republic, and brought her to the U.S. Her grandmother and uncle would later abduct her from her mother's home in New York and bring her to Florida, in an attempt to protect her from her mother's boyfriend. Her uncle was later murdered in a hate crime. She attended Florida State University where she met her future husband 'Omar Ellison. She studied English and law, but left before graduating after she became pregnant. She was recruited by modeling agency IMG. She and Ellison later divorced.

Rodriguez moved to Los Angeles in the early 2000s with her two children after her divorce from Ellison. After a bout with anorexia and a divorce, she turned to comedy for healing. For a time, she and her children were homeless and lived out of a car.

Career
Rodriguez attempts to transform painful episodes of her life into comedy material, while also addressing difficult issues such as misogyny and racism.

She was a top ten finalist in the eighth season of NBC's Last Comic Standing (2014), but was eliminated in the seventh episode of the season after losing a head-to-head showdown against Rod Man (who ultimately won the LCS title). She finished in a tie for ninth place.

Rodriguez is a five-time host of the Imagen Awards, which recognizes "the positive portrayal and creative excellence of Latinos and Latino cultures on screen".

Through the stand-up comedy circuit, Rodriguez met Tiffany Haddish, who has proven a long-time friend and a strong advocate for women of color comics. In August 2019, Rodriguez was featured in the comedy anthology series Tiffany Haddish Presents: They Ready on Netflix. She was one of six featured comedians, each given a half-hour comedy special.

Currently, Rodriguez appears as a co-host of The Young Turks online platform.

In collaboration with HBO Max, Rodriguez released her debut hour-long comedy special on November 4, 2021. Throughout the special, she speaks on issues in today's world and relates them to her personal life.

Filmography

Film

Television

Comedy releases

References

External links
 
 

1977 births
Living people
Actresses from Boston
Comedians from Massachusetts
Female models from Massachusetts
American stand-up comedians
American political commentators
American women comedians
American actresses of Puerto Rican descent
American people of Dominican Republic descent
American expatriates in the Dominican Republic
Puerto Rican female models
Hispanic and Latino American female models
The Young Turks people
20th-century American women
21st-century American women
21st-century American comedians